The Beijing Midi School of Music (北京迷笛音乐学校; pinyin: Běijīng Mídí Yīnyuè Xuéxiào) is a music school in Beijing, China, established in 1993.  It is the first music school in China whose curriculum focuses on such modern musical genres as rock, jazz, blues, pop, Latin, country, funk, and fusion.

The school's mission is "to promote an artistic and humanistic theory of modern music while offering students classes in advanced musical techniques."

The school sponsors the popular annual Midi Music Festival, which was first held in May 2000 in Beijing, Midi Music Awards and the Beijing Jazz Festival.

The School's Dean is Zhang Fan.

See also
Chinese rock

References

External links
 Beijing Midi School of Music official site
 Midi Music Festival site
 Interview with Zhang Fan, Dean of the Beijing Midi School of Music (English)

Educational institutions established in 1993
Universities and colleges in Beijing
Music schools in China
1993 establishments in China